The Classic is the fourth regular studio album by the American artist Joan As Police Woman (aka Joan Wasser), released on March 10, 2014, through PIAS. It included the single "Holy City" that was inspired by a visit to Jerusalem.The song was described as "Motown-influenced pop fusion" and the release was supported by an Alex de Campi directed video.

The comedian Reggie Watts contributed beatboxing to the title track and rapping to the single "Holy City."

In 2016 it was awarded a silver certification from the Independent Music Companies Association which indicated sales of at least 20,000 copies throughout Europe.

Track listing

Personnel
Joan Wasser – vocals, guitar, strings, clavinet, electric piano 
Tyler Wood – bass guitar, electronic organ, trumpet, piano, synthesizer, percussion, backing vocals
Parker Kindred – drums, percussion, backing vocals
Doug Wieselman – baritone saxophone and tenor saxophone
Oren Bloedow – guitar
Briggan Krauss – baritone saxophone, alto saxophone
Steven Bernstein – trumpet and French horn
Joseph Arthur, Nathan Larson, Michelle Zayla, Stephanie McKay, Toshi Reagon – backing vocals
Reggie Watts – outro on "Holy City"', human beatbox on "The Classic"

Technical personnel
Tyler Wood  – engineering, mixing and production
Murray Trider  – engineering (Ground Control)
Jack McKeever & TJ Doherty  – engineering (Maid's Room)
Adam Sachs  – engineering (Trout) and mixing on "The Classic"
Dan Shatzky  – engineering (Vibromonk)

Design
Lance Scott Walker - graphic design
Stephanie Sidjakov - photography/graphic design
Dan Monick - cover photograph

References

2014 albums
Joan as Police Woman albums